Shao Zhilin (born June 12, 1995) is a Chinese male curler.

Teams and events

Notes

References

External links
 

 Video: 

1995 births
Living people
Chinese male curlers
Sportspeople from Harbin